The Patent and Designs Act 1911 is a law concerning intellectual property in Bangladesh. It includes several key definitions, including of ‘Attorney General’, ‘Copyright’, ‘Design’, ‘Patent’ and ‘Manufacture’.

History
In the Indian Sub-continent, the Patents and Designs Act was enacted in 1911 mainly on the basis of the principles laid down in the Statute of Monopolies, Patents, Design and Trade Marks Act, 1883 and Patents and Designs Act, 1907. The Patents and Designs Act, 1911, is the main law in force in Bangladesh on patents and designs. Since enactment of the law, the concepts of patents and designs have undergone enormous development through decisions of courts around the world. 

The Parliament of Bangladesh enacted an amendment to the law in 2003.

Content
The law covers subjects of copyright, enforcement of intellectual property rights, industrial designs, intellectual property regulatory body and patents (inventions).

Format
The formal of the act is divided among the following parts.
 Part I: Patents (Sections 3 to 42),
 Part II: Designs (Sections 43 to 54),
 Part III: General (Sections 55 to 81).

See also
The Penal Code, 1860 (Bangladesh)
Sale of Goods Act, 1930 (Bangladesh)
Contract Act, 1872 (Bangladesh)
Laws in Bangladesh

References

Law of Bangladesh
Bangladeshi intellectual property law
1911 in law
Bangladesh